The 1987–88 New York Rangers season was the franchise's 62nd season. The Rangers compiled a 36–34–10 record during the regular season, but despite having 82 points, they were eliminated from playoff contention after their last game when the New Jersey Devils beat the Chicago Blackhawks. This would be the only time in the 1980s in which the Rangers missed the playoffs.

Offseason
Rangers General Manager Phil Esposito was part of the four man committee that would select players and coaches for Team Canada at the 1987 Canada Cup.

Regular season

The Rangers led the league in power-play goals scored, with 111. They also scored the fewest short-handed goals during the regular season out of all 21 teams, with just 6.

Final standings

Schedule and results

|- align="center" bgcolor="white"
| 1 || 8 || Pittsburgh Penguins || 4 – 4 OT || 0–0–1
|- align="center" bgcolor="#CCFFCC"
| 2 || 10 || @ Hartford Whalers || 6–2 || 1–0–1
|- align="center" bgcolor="#CCFFCC"
| 3 || 12 || Minnesota North Stars || 4–2 || 2–0–1
|- align="center" bgcolor="white"
| 4 || 15 || @ Pittsburgh Penguins || 6 – 6 OT || 2–0–2
|- align="center" bgcolor="#FFBBBB"
| 5 || 17 || @ Washington Capitals || 4–3 || 2–1–2
|- align="center" bgcolor="#FFBBBB"
| 6 || 19 || Washington Capitals || 4–2 || 2–2–2
|- align="center" bgcolor="#FFBBBB"
| 7 || 21 || Calgary Flames || 5–4 || 2–3–2
|- align="center" bgcolor="#CCFFCC"
| 8 || 23 || Chicago Blackhawks || 7–3 || 3–3–2
|- align="center" bgcolor="#CCFFCC"
| 9 || 24 || @ Philadelphia Flyers || 5–3 || 4–3–2
|- align="center" bgcolor="white"
| 10 || 26 || Philadelphia Flyers || 2 – 2 OT || 4–3–3
|- align="center" bgcolor="#FFBBBB"
| 11 || 28 || Los Angeles Kings || 4–3 || 4–4–3
|- align="center" bgcolor="#FFBBBB"
| 12 || 31 || @ New York Islanders || 8–2 || 4–5–3
|-

|- align="center" bgcolor="#FFBBBB"
| 13 || 1 || Edmonton Oilers || 7–6 || 4–6–3
|- align="center" bgcolor="#FFBBBB"
| 14 || 3 || @ Calgary Flames || 5–3 || 4–7–3
|- align="center" bgcolor="#FFBBBB"
| 15 || 4 || @ Edmonton Oilers || 7–2 || 4–8–3
|- align="center" bgcolor="#FFBBBB"
| 16 || 7 || @ Los Angeles Kings || 5–4 || 4–9–3
|- align="center" bgcolor="#FFBBBB"
| 17 || 10 || New Jersey Devils || 3–2 || 4–10–3
|- align="center" bgcolor="#FFBBBB"
| 18 || 14 || @ Pittsburgh Penguins || 3 – 2 OT || 4–11–3
|- align="center" bgcolor="#CCFFCC"
| 19 || 15 || Winnipeg Jets || 6–4 || 5–11–3
|- align="center" bgcolor="#FFBBBB"
| 20 || 19 || @ Minnesota North Stars || 4–3 || 5–12–3
|- align="center" bgcolor="#CCFFCC"
| 21 || 20 || @ Winnipeg Jets || 4–3 || 6–12–3
|- align="center" bgcolor="#CCFFCC"
| 22 || 25 || Toronto Maple Leafs || 5–3 || 7–12–3
|- align="center" bgcolor="#FFBBBB"
| 23 || 28 || @ New York Islanders || 5–4 || 7–13–3
|- align="center" bgcolor="#CCFFCC"
| 24 || 29 || New York Islanders || 3–1 || 8–13–3
|-

|- align="center" bgcolor="#FFBBBB"
| 25 || 3 || @ Boston Bruins || 4–3 || 8–14–3
|- align="center" bgcolor="#CCFFCC"
| 26 || 5 || @ St. Louis Blues || 3–2 || 9–14–3
|- align="center" bgcolor="white"
| 27 || 9 || Montreal Canadiens || 2 – 2 OT || 9–14–4
|- align="center" bgcolor="#FFBBBB"
| 28 || 10 || @ Philadelphia Flyers || 5–3 || 9–15–4
|- align="center" bgcolor="#FFBBBB"
| 29 || 12 || @ Toronto Maple Leafs || 4–3 || 9–16–4
|- align="center" bgcolor="#CCFFCC"
| 30 || 14 || Detroit Red Wings || 4–3 || 10–16–4
|- align="center" bgcolor="#CCFFCC"
| 31 || 16 || New Jersey Devils || 9–3 || 11–16–4
|- align="center" bgcolor="#FFBBBB"
| 32 || 19 || @ Pittsburgh Penguins || 4–3 || 11–17–4
|- align="center" bgcolor="#FFBBBB"
| 33 || 20 || Pittsburgh Penguins || 8–4 || 11–18–4
|- align="center" bgcolor="#FFBBBB"
| 34 || 22 || Philadelphia Flyers || 6–4 || 11–19–4
|- align="center" bgcolor="#CCFFCC"
| 35 || 26 || @ New Jersey Devils || 5–3 || 12–19–4
|- align="center" bgcolor="#CCFFCC"
| 36 || 27 || Boston Bruins || 4–1 || 13–19–4
|- align="center" bgcolor="white"
| 37 || 29 || @ New York Islanders || 3 – 3 OT || 13–19–5
|- align="center" bgcolor="#CCFFCC"
| 38 || 31 || Quebec Nordiques || 6–1 || 14–19–5
|-

|- align="center" bgcolor="#CCFFCC"
| 39 || 2 || @ Minnesota North Stars || 5–3 || 15–19–5
|- align="center" bgcolor="#CCFFCC"
| 40 || 4 || St. Louis Blues || 6–2 || 16–19–5
|- align="center" bgcolor="#CCFFCC"
| 41 || 6 || Vancouver Canucks || 4–2 || 17–19–5
|- align="center" bgcolor="#FFBBBB"
| 42 || 8 || @ Washington Capitals || 8–4 || 17–20–5
|- align="center" bgcolor="#FFBBBB"
| 43 || 10 || @ Buffalo Sabres || 4–3 || 17–21–5
|- align="center" bgcolor="white"
| 44 || 11 || Chicago Blackhawks || 2 – 2 OT || 17–21–6
|- align="center" bgcolor="#FFBBBB"
| 45 || 13 || Detroit Red Wings || 7–4 || 17–22–6
|- align="center" bgcolor="#FFBBBB"
| 46 || 16 || @ Montreal Canadiens || 4–3 || 17–23–6
|- align="center" bgcolor="#FFBBBB"
| 47 || 17 || Philadelphia Flyers || 2–1 || 17–24–6
|- align="center" bgcolor="#FFBBBB"
| 48 || 19 || @ Los Angeles Kings || 6–3 || 17–25–6
|- align="center" bgcolor="#CCFFCC"
| 49 || 22 || @ Vancouver Canucks || 6–3 || 18–25–6
|- align="center" bgcolor="#CCFFCC"
| 50 || 28 || @ Philadelphia Flyers || 5–2 || 19–25–6
|- align="center" bgcolor="#CCFFCC"
| 51 || 30 || @ Boston Bruins || 4–2 || 20–25–6
|-

|- align="center" bgcolor="white"
| 52 || 2 || @ New York Islanders || 2 – 2 OT || 20–25–7
|- align="center" bgcolor="#FFBBBB"
| 53 || 4 || @ Quebec Nordiques || 3–2 || 20–26–7
|- align="center" bgcolor="#CCFFCC"
| 54 || 6 || @ Washington Capitals || 3–0 || 21–26–7
|- align="center" bgcolor="#CCFFCC"
| 55 || 7 || Pittsburgh Penguins || 6–3 || 22–26–7
|- align="center" bgcolor="#FFBBBB"
| 56 || 11 || Washington Capitals || 5–3 || 22–27–7
|- align="center" bgcolor="white"
| 57 || 14 || New York Islanders || 4 – 4 OT || 22–27–8
|- align="center" bgcolor="#CCFFCC"
| 58 || 15 || Montreal Canadiens || 3–1 || 23–27–8
|- align="center" bgcolor="#CCFFCC"
| 59 || 17 || Calgary Flames || 5–3 || 24–27–8
|- align="center" bgcolor="#FFBBBB"
| 60 || 19 || @ New Jersey Devils || 6–3 || 24–28–8
|- align="center" bgcolor="#FFBBBB"
| 61 || 21 || Vancouver Canucks || 6–4 || 24–29–8
|- align="center" bgcolor="#CCFFCC"
| 62 || 25 || Pittsburgh Penguins || 2–1 || 25–29–8
|- align="center" bgcolor="#CCFFCC"
| 63 || 26 || @ New Jersey Devils || 2–1 || 26–29–8
|- align="center" bgcolor="#CCFFCC"
| 64 || 29 || St. Louis Blues || 5–2 || 27–29–8
|-

|- align="center" bgcolor="#CCFFCC"
| 65 || 2 || New York Islanders || 3–1 || 28–29–8
|- align="center" bgcolor="#FFBBBB"
| 66 || 4 || @ Buffalo Sabres || 6–3 || 28–30–8
|- align="center" bgcolor="#FFBBBB"
| 67 || 5 || @ Hartford Whalers || 3–1 || 28–31–8
|- align="center" bgcolor="#CCFFCC"
| 68 || 8 || New Jersey Devils || 7–4 || 29–31–8
|- align="center" bgcolor="#CCFFCC"
| 69 || 12 || @ Washington Capitals || 4–2 || 30–31–8
|- align="center" bgcolor="#CCFFCC"
| 70 || 15 || Philadelphia Flyers || 3–1 || 31–31–8
|- align="center" bgcolor="#FFBBBB"
| 71 || 16 || Washington Capitals || 8–4 || 31–32–8
|- align="center" bgcolor="#CCFFCC"
| 72 || 19 || @ Toronto Maple Leafs || 4–3 || 32–32–8
|- align="center" bgcolor="#CCFFCC"
| 73 || 20 || Hartford Whalers || 2–1 || 33–32–8
|- align="center" bgcolor="#FFBBBB"
| 74 || 22 || Buffalo Sabres || 3–2 || 33–33–8
|- align="center" bgcolor="#CCFFCC"
| 75 || 24 || Edmonton Oilers || 6–1 || 34–33–8
|- align="center" bgcolor="white"
| 76 || 26 || @ Detroit Red Wings || 4 – 4 OT || 34–33–9
|- align="center" bgcolor="#FFBBBB"
| 77 || 27 || @ New Jersey Devils || 7–2 || 34–34–9
|- align="center" bgcolor="#CCFFCC"
| 78 || 30 || @ Chicago Blackhawks || 4–3 || 35–34–9
|-

|- align="center" bgcolor="white"
| 79 || 1 || @ Winnipeg Jets || 6 – 6 OT || 35–34–10
|- align="center" bgcolor="#CCFFCC"
| 80 || 3 || Quebec Nordiques || 3–0 || 36–34–10
|-

Playoffs
The Rangers failed to qualify for the 1988 Stanley Cup playoffs. After a 6–6 tie against the Winnipeg Jets in the second-to-last game of the season, the Rangers and New Jersey Devils entered their final game of the season with 80 points each. If the Rangers and Devils won, the Devils would go to the playoffs on a tiebreaker. The Rangers defeated the Quebec Nordiques 3–0. Later that night, however, the Devils defeated the Chicago Blackhawks in overtime to win the tiebreaker and the final Patrick Division spot. Both the Rangers and Devils finished tied with 82 points. However, the Devils had 38 wins to the Rangers' 36, so the Devils qualified for the final playoff spot in the Patrick Division.

Player statistics
Skaters

Goaltenders

†Denotes player spent time with another team before joining Rangers. Stats reflect time with Rangers only.
‡Traded mid-season. Stats reflect time with Rangers only.

Awards and records

Transactions

Draft picks
New York's picks at the 1987 NHL Entry Draft in Detroit, Michigan at the Joe Louis Arena.

Supplemental Draft
New York's picks at the 1987 NHL Supplemental Draft.

Farm teams

See also
1987–88 NHL season

References

New York Rangers seasons
New York Rangers
New York Rangers
New York Rangers
New York Rangers
1980s in Manhattan
Madison Square Garden